CG-17 may refer to :

 Douglas XCG-17, a conversion of the American C-47 Skytrain transport as an assault glider
 USS Harry E. Yarnell (CG-17), Leahy-class guided missile cruiser of the United States Navy